Opharus momis is a moth of the family Erebidae. It was described by Harrison Gray Dyar Jr. in 1912. It is found in Mexico.

References

Opharus
Moths described in 1912
Moths of Central America